Stuttgart Valley Roller Derby is a women's flat track roller derby league based in Stuttgart. Founded in 2006, the league currently consists of two teams which compete against teams from other leagues. Stuttgart is a member of the Women's Flat Track Derby Association (WFTDA).

History
The league was the second to be founded in Europe, in the same month as the London Rollergirls, founded in April 2006.  The leagues did not initially know about the formation of each other.  As it was the first roller derby league in Germany, it initially bouted against teams from the UK.  The SVRG played the London Rockin' Rollers in November 2007, in the first public bout in Europe between two leagues and in June 2009 the first all German game against Barock City Roller Derby.

Other leagues began appearing in Germany in 2008 and 2009, with Stuttgart giving particular assistance to Bear City Roller Derby in organising itself.  The Zurich Rollergirlz credit Stuttgart with helping organise Switzerland's first roller derby information meeting.

The first German Championship was held in December 2010 in Berlin, Stuttgart beating Bear City Roller Derby 128–124 in the final.

In October 2011, Stuttgart entered the WFTDA Apprentice Program, and it became a full member of the WFTDA in March 2013.

International
Ten of Stuttgart's skaters were selected for Team Germany at the 2011 Roller Derby World Cup, and one was selected for Team Brazil.

WFTDA rankings

References

Roller derby leagues in Germany
Sport in Stuttgart
Roller derby leagues established in 2006
Women's Flat Track Derby Association Division 3
2006 establishments in Germany